Travis Mutyaba (born 7 August 2005 in Nansana) is a Ugandan footballer who plays for Uganda Premier League club SC Villa and the Uganda national team.

Club career
In August 2021 Mutyaba signed a three-year contract with Uganda Premier League club SC Villa. Prior to signing for Villa, he played for the junior team of Vipers SC and Synergy FC of the Futsal Super League, in which he was one of the league's top scorers. By December 2021, he had reportedly drawn interest from clubs in Italy and France.

International career
In 2019 Mutyaba was part of the Uganda under-15 team that won the 2019 CECAFA U-15 Championship in Eritrea. In the team's second match of the group stage, he scored his team's only two goals in a victory over Tanzania. He scored again in a 4–0 victory over Kenya in the final to help clinch the title. The following year he was named the Most Valuable Player as Uganda won the 2020 CECAFA U-17 Championship held in Rwanda.

Mutyaba was called up to the senior national team for a friendly against Tanzania at age 16. He went on to make his senior debut in the eventual 2–0 victory. In January 2022 he was called up again for five friendlies with national sides from Europe and Asia as the Cranes traveled to Turkey, Iraq, and Bahrain.

International career statistics

Youth international goals
Scores and results list the Uganda's goal tally first.

References

External links

2005 births
Living people
Ugandan footballers
Uganda international footballers
Association football midfielders
SC Villa players
2022 African Nations Championship players
Uganda A' international footballers
People from Wakiso District